Microalgae or microphytes are microscopic algae invisible to the naked eye. They are phytoplankton typically found in freshwater and marine systems, living in both the water column and sediment. They are unicellular species which exist individually, or in chains or groups. Depending on the species, their sizes can range from a few micrometers (μm) to a few hundred micrometers. Unlike higher plants, microalgae do not have roots, stems, or leaves. They are specially adapted to an environment dominated by viscous forces.

Microalgae, capable of performing photosynthesis, are important for life on earth; they produce approximately half of the atmospheric oxygen and use the greenhouse gas carbon dioxide to grow photoautotrophically. "Marine photosynthesis is dominated by microalgae, which together with cyanobacteria, are collectively called phytoplankton." Microalgae, together with bacteria, form the base of the food web and provide energy for all the trophic levels above them. Microalgae biomass is often measured with chlorophyll a concentrations and can provide a useful index of potential production.

The biodiversity of microalgae is enormous and they represent an almost untapped resource. It has been estimated that about 200,000-800,000 species in many different genera exist of which about 50,000 species are described. Over 15,000 novel compounds originating from algal biomass have been chemically determined. Examples include carotenoids, antioxidants, fatty acids, enzymes, polymers, peptides, toxins and sterols. Besides providing these valuable metabolites, microalgae is regarded as a potential feedstock for biofuels and has also emerged as a promising microorganism in bioremediation.

An exception to the microalgae family is the colorless Prototheca which are devoid of any chlorophyll. These achlorophic algae switch to parasitism and thus cause the disease protothecosis in human and animals.



Characteristics and uses

The chemical composition of microalgae is not an intrinsic constant factor but varies over a wide range of factors, both depending on species and on cultivation conditions. Some microalgae have the capacity to acclimate to changes in environmental conditions by altering their chemical composition in response to environmental variability. A particularly dramatic example is their ability to replace phospholipids with non-phosphorus membrane lipids in phosphorus-depleted environments. It is possible to accumulate the desired products in microalgae to a large extent by changing environmental factors, like temperature, illumination, pH, CO2 supply, salt and nutrients.

Microphytes also produce chemical signals which contribute to prey selection, defense, and avoidance. These chemical signals affect large scale tropic structures such as algal blooms but propagate by simple diffusion and laminar advective flow. Microalgae such as microphytes constitute the basic foodstuff for numerous aquaculture species, especially filtering bivalves.

Photo- and chemosynthetic algae 
Photosynthetic and chemosynthetic microbes can also form symbiotic relationships with host organisms. They provide them with vitamins and polyunsaturated fatty acids, necessary for the growth of the bivalves which are unable to synthesize it themselves. In addition, because the cells grow in aqueous suspension, they have more efficient access to water, CO2, and other nutrients.

Microalgae play a major role in nutrient cycling and fixing inorganic carbon into organic molecules and expressing oxygen in marine biosphere.

While fish oil has become famous for its omega-3 fatty acid content, fish don't actually produce omega-3s, instead accumulating their omega-3 reserves by consuming microalgae. These omega-3 fatty acids can be obtained in the human diet directly from the microalgae that produce them.

Microalgae can accumulate considerable amounts of proteins depending on species and cultivation conditions. Due to their ability to grow on non-arable land microalgae may provide an alternative protein source for human consumption or animal feed. Microalgae proteins are also investigated as thickening agents or emulsion and foam stabilizers in the food industry to replace animal based proteins.

Some microalgae accumulate chromophores like chlorophyll, carotenoids, or phycobiliproteins that may be extracted and used as coloring agents.

Cultivation of microalgae

A range of microalgae species are produced in hatcheries and are used in a variety of ways for commercial purposes, including for human nutrition, as biofuel, in the aquaculture of other organisms, in the manufacture of pharmaceuticals and cosmetics, and as biofertiliser. However, the low cell density is a major bottleneck in commercial viability of many microalgae derived products, especially low cost commodities.

Studies have investigated the main factors in the success of a microalgae hatchery system to be:
Geometry and scale of cultivation systems (referred as photobioreactors); 
Light intensity;  
Concentration of carbon dioxide in the gas phase
Nutrient levels (mainly N, P, K)
Mixing of culture

See also

 AlgaeBase
 Raceway pond

References

External links

NOAA, DMS and Climate
Microalgae concentrates
Microalgae research
"From Micro-Algae to Blue Oil", ParisTech Review, Dec. 2011

Company
Microphyt - Microalgae Production and Photobioreactor Design

Biological oceanography
Planktology
Aquatic ecology